Snelling & Hewitt is a bus rapid transit station on the Metro A Line in Saint Paul, Minnesota.

The station is located at the intersection of Hewitt Avenue on Snelling Avenue. Both station platforms are located far-side of Hewitt Avenue.

The station opened June 11, 2016 with the rest of the A Line.

Bus connections
This station does not have any bus connections. Route 84 providing local service on Snelling Avenue shares platforms with the A Line.

Notable places nearby
Hamline University
Hamline-Midway, Saint Paul

References

External links 
 Metro Transit: Snelling & Hewitt Station

Bus stations in Minnesota